John Botetourt, 1st Baron Botetourt (died 1324) was an English military commander and admiral in the 13th and 14th centuries.

Personal
He married Matilda fitz Thomas, daughter of Sir Thomas fitz Otes and Beatrice de Beauchamp.

Career
He was the Governor of St Briavels Castle in 1291, became the Admiral of the North between 1294 and 1297, burning Cherbourg in 1295, and created 1st Lord Botetourt on 13 July 1305. In 1304 he received a commission under the great seal to hear and determine the causes of a violent quarrel between the mayor and burgesses of Bristol and Lord Thomas of Berkeley and his son Maurice. He was the warden of the Forest of Dean. He fought in the expeditions of King Edward I to Gascony, Scotland and during the Wars of Scottish Independence. He was summoned to parliament from 1305 to 1324. He joined Guy Beauchamp, earl of Warwick, in carrying off Piers Gaveston from the custody of the Earl of Pembroke, and, in common with the other nobles concerned in the death of the favourite, made his peace with the king in 1313. He was appointed the Governor of Framlingham Castle in 1314. He was again the Admiral for the Northern Seas in 1315. John participated in the Battle of Boroughbridge on 16 March 1322, on the side of Thomas, Earl of Lancaster's rebels. He was then fined £1,000 and pardoned on 8 October 1322 for his part in the rebellion. He died on 25 November 1324, and his grandson John succeeded him as Baron Botetourt, as his son Thomas had predeceased him.

Issue
John and Matilda fitz Thomas had the following known issue:
Thomas de Botetourt d. 1322.
Elizabeth Botetourt, married William Latimer, 3rd Baron Latimer, had issue including:
William Latimer, 4th Baron Latimer.
Ada Botetourt, married Sir John de St. Philibert d.1322, had 4 issues. Then married Richard Fitz-Simon, d. 1349.

References

Sources

 Houbraken,  Jacobus. Thoyras, Paul de Rapin. Vertue, George. (1747). The History of England, A List of Admirals of England (1224-1745). England. Kanpton. P and J.

1324 deaths
13th-century English Navy personnel
14th-century English Navy personnel
English rebels
Year of birth uncertain
English people of the Wars of Scottish Independence
English admirals
English knights